Penélope Cruz (born 28 April 1974) is a Spanish actress. She made her acting debut at the age of 16 on television and her feature film debut the following year in Jamón Jamón (1992). Her subsequent roles in the 1990s and 2000s included Open Your Eyes (1997), The Hi-Lo Country (1999), The Girl of Your Dreams (2000) and Woman on Top (2000). Cruz achieved greater international recognition for her lead roles in the 2001 films Vanilla Sky, All the Pretty Horses, Captain Corelli's Mandolin and Blow. 

She has since appeared in a wide variety of film genres, including the comedy Waking Up in Reno (2002), the thriller Gothika (2003), the Christmas film Noel (2004), and the action adventure Sahara (2005). She was acclaimed for her roles in Volver (2006) and Nine (2009), for which she received Academy Award nominations, the former being her first in the Best Actress category, as well as for her role in Vicky Cristina Barcelona (2008), for which she subsequently won the Academy Award for Best Supporting Actress. She is the first and only Spanish actress to both win and be nominated for an Academy Award in an acting category.

Film

Television

References

Actress filmographies
Spanish filmographies